Astralium semicostatum, common name the half-ribbed star shell, is a species of sea snail, a marine gastropod mollusk in the family Turbinidae, the turban snails.

Description
The size of the shell varies between 25 mm and 40 mm. The solid, imperforate shell has an elevated-conic shape. Its color pattern is olive-brown or cinereous. The apex is acute. The 6-7 whorls are, sharply carinated. Their upper surface is concave, longitudinally more or less finely and irregularly plicate below the sutures; coarsely plicate on the lower half of the whorls. The folds terminate in short nodes at the periphery, twelve to sixteen in number on the body whorl, and also scalloping the sutures. The base of the shell is flat, somewhat depressed around the middle, finely concentrically lirate and radiately striate. The lirae number about eight to sixteen. The suboval aperture is very oblique, white within, slightly channelled at the carina, but scarcely angulate. The short columella is bluish, rosy or white, curved, and dentate below. The base of the aperture is horizontal, sometimes with a submarginal row of minute tubercles within.

In some specimens the peripheral spines are rather long and directed outward. The lirae of the base are sometimes coarser than the figures indicate. And in fully matured individuals the outer ones become obsolete.

Distribution
The marine species occurs off Southeast Asia.

References

External links
 To World Register of Marine Species
 

semicostatum
Gastropods described in 1875